2017 Manchester mayoral election may refer to:

 2017 Greater Manchester mayoral election, in Greater Manchester, England
 2017 Manchester, New Hampshire mayoral election, in Manchester, New Hampshire, United States